

Yearly events 
state championships
state league

State teams 
The South Australian Softball Association attends all ASF National Championships

For the 2006 Championships the following was entered
Under 16 Girls
Under 16 Boys
Under 19 Women's – 1st
Under 23 Women's
Open Women's

Associations 
Insert Associations

See also 
Australian Softball Federation
ASF National Championships

External links 
South Australia Softball Association inc.
Australian Softball Federation
International Softball Federation

Softball governing bodies in Australia
Sports governing bodies in South Australia